The Programme for the Endorsement of Forest Certification (PEFC) is an international, non-profit, non-governmental organization which promotes sustainable forest management through independent third party certification. It is considered the certification system of choice for small forest owners.

It is based in Geneva, Switzerland.

History 
PEFC was founded in 1999 as an international umbrella organization providing independent assessment, endorsement and recognition of national forest certification systems. Its founding was in response to the difficulties faced by small, family-owned and community forests in achieving certification under the Forest Stewardship Council.

In 2000, PEFC made its first endorsements of the national standards used by Finland, Sweden, Norway, Germany and Austria. In 2004 it endorsed its first non-European national standards, used by Australia and Chile. As a consequence PEFC changed its name from Pan European Forest Certification to Programme for the Endorsement of Forest Certification Schemes.

The endorsement of the Canadian standard in 2005 made PEFC the world's largest resource of certified wood, with more than 100 million hectares of certified forest area. Three years later, PEFC certified area grew to 200 million hectares, which is equivalent to two-thirds of the total area certified against credible forest certification globally.

Today, PEFC is the world's largest forest certification system and the certification system of choice for small forest owners.

Sustainable forest management criteria 

PEFC International is the only international forest certification scheme that bases its criteria on internationally accepted intergovernmental conventions and guidelines, thereby linking its sustainability benchmark criteria with existing governmental processes. This includes:

Pan-European Criteria, Indicators and Operational Level Guidelines for Sustainable Forest Management (Ministerial Conference on the Protection of Forests in Europe)
ATO/ITTO Principles, criteria and indicators for the sustainable forest management of African natural tropical forests (ATO/ITTO)
ITTO guidelines on sustainable forest management (ITTO)

PEFC requires adherence to all eight core ILO conventions, even in countries which have not ratified them. These conventions are
No 29: Forced Labour (1930)
No 87: Freedom of Associations and Protection of the Right to Organise (1948)
No 98: Right to Organise and Collective Bargaining (1949)
No 100: Equal Remuneration (1951)
No 105: Abolition of Forced Labour (1957)
No 111: Discrimination (Employment and Occupation) (1958)
No 138: Minimum Age for Admission to Employment (1973)
No. 182: Worst Forms of Child Labour (1999)

National forest certification systems 
PEFC only recognize forests certified to standards that have been reviewed and endorsed by PEFC.

National forest certification systems that wish to be recognized by are required to set standards keeping with the requirements of ISO/IEC Guide 59:1994 Code of good practice for standardization. National standards must be developed by so-called National Governing Bodies, and meet requirements for transparency, consultation and decision-making by consensus. These guidelines also outline processes for revising and amending standards, and provide those who utilise the standard with the security of future certainty.

Endorsements 
All PEFC-endorsed standards have been subjected to public review during their development. National forest certification systems wanting to obtain PEFC endorsement are subject to an independent assessment to ensure that it meets the PEFC requirements for the standards development process, public review and forest management requirements. The consultant's report is reviewed by an independent Panel of Experts and the PEFC Board, and if satisfactory, the new standard is approved by the PEFC members as a PEFC-endorsed standard.
To ensure the independence of the certification bodies, they are not accredited by PEFC itself, but by a national accreditation agency.

In line with its commitment to transparency, PEFC makes its entire documentation of national forest certification system, including the independent assessments, publicly available. Information about all issued certificates, including information about suspended, withdrawn and expired certificates, is publicly available on the PEFC website.

Countries 
Countries with PEFC endorsed national certification systems include: Argentina, Australia, Austria, Belarus, Belgium, Brazil, Canada, Chile, China, Czech Republic, Denmark, Estonia, Finland, France, Gabon, Germany, Indonesia, India, Ireland, Italy, Japan, Latvia, Luxembourg, Malaysia, Netherlands, Norway, Poland, Portugal, Russia, Slovak Republic, Slovenia, Spain, Sweden, Switzerland, Thailand, United Kingdom, United States, Uruguay and Viet Nam.

Criticism and alternative certification schemes 
Forest Stewardship Council is the main alternative forest certification system. Mutual recognition of FSC and PEFC certified material in the chain of custody has not yet happened. However, FSC and PEFC use the same forest management standard in countries such as the United Kingdom, Switzerland and Norway; Malaysia has submitted its timber certification scheme for PEFC endorsement that is largely based on FSC principles and criteria.

Several environmental non-governmental organizations, such as The Wilderness Society,
Greenpeace and FERN have criticized the PEFC. Greenpeace does not believe alternatives to the FSC, including PEFC, can ensure responsible forest management.

See also
Deforestation by region

References

External links
Programme for the Endorsement of Forest Certification
PEFC Argentina
PEFC Austria
Brazilian Program of Forest Certification , member of the PEFC
PEFC Canada
PEFC Finland
PEFC France
PEFC Germany
PEFC Italy
Malaysian Timber Certification Council
PEFC Spain
PEFC Sweden
Sustainable Forestry Initiative (USA)
PEFC United Kingdom
PEFC Netherlands (Dutch)

Critics
The Wilderness Society

International forestry organizations
Forest certification
International organisations based in Switzerland